Lapiș Forest nature reserve IUCN category IV, is located in northwestern Romania, in the west of Sălaj County, near the village of Nușfalău, which is about 9 km from Șimleu Silvaniei.

Description 

Flora and fauna

Flora

Vegetation of forest
Pedunculate oak (Quercus pedunculiflora), sessile oak (Quercus petraea), small-leaved lime (Tilia cordata), English oak (Quercus robur), Hungarian oak (Quercus frainetto), European ash (Fraxinus excelsior), Turkey oak (Quercus cerris), European black pine, (Pinus nigra), Scots pine (Pinus sylvestris), black locust (Robinia pseudoacacia), wild cherry (Prunus avium);

Species of grass
Lungwort (Pulmonaria officinalis), wild arum (Arum maculatum), windflower (Anemone nemorosa), yellow wood anemone (Anemone ranunculoides), smooth meadow-grass (Poa pratensis), red fescue (Festuca rubra).

Fauna

Mammals
Fallow deer (Dama dama), red deer (Cervus elaphus), roe deer (Capreolus capreolus), red fox (Vulpes vulpes), wild boar (Sus scrofa), European pine marten (Marten marten), European hamster (Cricetus cricetus), wildcat (Felis silvestris);

Birds
Avifauna include the lesser spotted woodpecker (Dendrocopos minor), tree pipit (Anthus trivalis), Eurasian scops owl (Otus scops), European greenfinch (Carduelis chloris), southern fiscal (Lanius collaris), Eurasian hobby (Falca subbuteo), blue tit (Parus caeruleus), common raven (Corvus corax), yellowhammer (Emberiza citrinella) and middle spotted woodpecker (Dendrocopos medius).

See also 
 Cehei Pond

References

Image gallery

Species of flora

Species of fauna

Protected areas of Romania
Geography of Sălaj County
Forests of Romania
Protected areas established in 2005
Tourist attractions in Sălaj County